The men's 1500 metre freestyle event at the 2020 Summer Olympics was held on 30 July and 1 August 2021 at the Tokyo Aquatics Centre. It will be the event's twenty-seventh consecutive appearance, having been held at every edition since 1904.

Records
Prior to this competition, the existing world and Olympic records were as follows.

Qualification

 
The Olympic Qualifying Time for the event is 15:00.99. Up to two swimmers per National Olympic Committee (NOC) can automatically qualify by swimming that time at an approved qualification event. The Olympic Selection Time is 15:28.02. Up to one swimmer per NOC meeting that time is eligible for selection, allocated by world ranking until the maximum quota for all swimming events is reached. NOCs without a male swimmer qualified in any event can also use their universality place.

Competition format

The competition consists of two rounds: heats and a final. The swimmers with the best 8 times in the heats advance to the final. Swim-offs are used as necessary to break ties for advancement to the next round.

Schedule
All times are Japan Standard Time (UTC+9)

Results

Heats
The swimmers with the top 8 times, regardless of heat, advanced to the final.

Final

References

Men's 01500 metre freestyle
Olympics
Men's events at the 2020 Summer Olympics